Donnybrook is a district of Dublin, Ireland. It is situated on the southside of the city, in the Dublin 4 postal district, and is home to the Irish public service broadcaster Raidió Teilifís Éireann (RTÉ). It was once part of the Pembroke Township. Its neighbouring suburbs are Ballsbridge, Sandymount, Ranelagh and Clonskeagh.

Donnybrook is also a civil parish mainly situated in the old barony of Dublin.

History

Donnybrook Fair dates from a charter of King John of England in 1204 and was held annually until 1855. It began as a fair for livestock and agricultural produce but later declined, growing into more of a carnival and funfair. Drunkenness, fighting, and hasty marriages became commonplace and the people of Donnybrook were anxious that it should cease. Eventually, the fair's reputation for tumult was its undoing. From the 1790s on, there were campaigns against the drunken brawl the fair had become. After a good deal of local fundraising, the patent was bought by a group of prominent residents and clergy, bringing about its demise. The Fair took place on lands now occupied by Donnybrook Rugby Ground and the Ever Ready Garage. The word donnybrook has since entered the English language to describe a rowdy brawl.

Donnybrook Castle was an Elizabethan mansion and residence of the Ussher family. James Ussher was appointed Archbishop of Armagh in the Church of Ireland by Queen Elizabeth I of England. The mansion was replaced in 1795 by the existing Georgian house. It is now occupied by the Religious Sisters of Charity.

Donnybrook Graveyard dates back to the 8th century and was once the location of a church founded by St Broc. It was also the site of Catholic and Church of Ireland churches, both called St Mary's. Those buried in it include Dr Bartholomew Mosse, the founder of the Rotunda Hospital, Sir Edward Lovett Pearce, architect of the Irish Houses of Parliament on College Green and Dr Richard Madden, biographer of the United Irishmen. It is possible that the wall on the south side of the cemetery is the oldest man-made structure still existing in Donnybrook. The brick chimney behind the cemetery was built on the site of a former marble works and later served as a Magdalene laundry. Two ancestors of Meghan Markle, Mary McCue and Thomas Bird, an English soldier, were married at St Mary's Church of Ireland church, Donnybrook, in 1860.

Geography
The river Dodder runs through Donnybrook and at one time there was a ford  here. It is subject to periodic serious flooding and in 1628 one of the Usshers of Donnybrook Castle drowned while trying to cross.

Civil parish
Donnybrook is a civil parish consisting of sixteen townlands. All but four of these townlands are situated in the Barony of Dublin. Donnybrook is the single biggest parish in that barony. The most southerly townlands, Annefield, Simmonscourt and Priesthouse, belong to the barony of Rathdown. The smallest of these, Annefield, is itself an enclave of Simmonscourt which gives its name to a pavilion of the Royal Dublin Society. Today, the majority of Priesthouse is occupied by Elm Park Golf Club and the studios of RTÉ. The remaining townland of Sallymount - the parish's most westerly point - is in the barony of Uppercross.

Donnybrook today
The television and radio studios of the national broadcaster, RTÉ, are located in Priesthouse, Donnybrook. There is also a large Dublin Bus garage located in the area.

Politics
Donnybrook is in the Dáil Éireann constituency of Dublin Bay South and the Pembroke local electoral area of Dublin City Council.

Education
 Donnybrook is home to the all-girls Muckross Park College.
 St. Mary's mixed primary school is located on Belmont Avenue.

People
 Writers
 Patrick Kavanagh
 Anthony Trollope
 Flann O'Brien aka Myles na gCopaleen aka Brian O'Nolan, lived on Belmont Avenue
 Benedict Kiely
 Padraic Colum
 Brendan Behan
 Denis Johnston and his wife, the actress/director Shelah Richards

 Others
 Jack B. Yeats
 Sir Ernest Henry Shackleton
 John Boyd Dunlop (pneumatic tyre inventor)
 Guglielmo Marconi (wireless radio - lived in Montrose House, the family home of his mother's family the Jamesons of whiskey fame, now on the grounds of the national broadcaster RTÉ)
 Éamon de Valera (President of Ireland)
 Pádraig Pearse (a leader of the 1916 Easter Rising)
 The O'Rahilly (also a senior figure in the 1916 Easter Rising)
 Michael Collins (Chairman of the Provisional Government and commander-in-chief of the National Army. killed during the Irish Civil War in 1922)
 George E. H. McElroy (WWI fighter ace RFC/RAF)
 Garret FitzGerald (former Taoiseach of Ireland)
 Albert Reynolds (former Taoiseach of Ireland)
 Shane MacGowan (singer/lyricist for the Pogues)
 Méav Ní Mhaolchatha (Singer, former Celtic Woman)
 Frederick May (composer)
 William Downes, 1st Baron Downes (eminent nineteenth-century judge)
 Richard Gibson - Actor - Played part of Herr Otto Flick in sitcom series 'Allo 'Allo!
 Beatrice Doran, librarian, historian, and author

Sport
Donnybrook is the traditional home of rugby union in Leinster. The headquarters of the Irish Rugby Football Union Leinster Branch is located opposite Donnybrook Stadium, where the professional Leinster team played their home games until recently. Most games are hosted in Donnybrook Stadium. Some Junior Cup ties are also hosted on the grounds.

Rugby clubs Bective Rangers and Old Wesley have their home ground in Donnybrook Stadium. During the school year secondary schools such as St Conleth's College, Blackrock, Belvedere College, Wesley College, Clongowes, St. Michaels and many more play rugby in Donnybrook Stadium.

There are several tennis clubs in Donnybrook, Donnybrook Lawn Tennis Club (LTC), St.Marys LTC and Bective LTC.

Belmont Football Club has its home ground in Herbert Park.

Merrion Cricket Club is located in Donnybrook, off Anglesea Road and backing onto the Dodder.

See also
 List of towns and villages in Ireland

References

 Dictionary.com/Word of the Day Archive/donnybrook — etymology of the noun
 Dublins Famous People and Where They Lived by John Cowell
 A Literary Guide To Dublin by Vivien Igoe

External links

 Donnybrook Parish (Sacred Heart Church) Web Site
 Friends of Donnybrook (Community Forum) Web Site
Donnybrook Tidy Towns Web Site

 
Towns and villages in Dublin (city)
Civil parishes of Rathdown, County Dublin
Dublin (barony)
Civil parishes of Uppercross